Alhameen Adeniyi Adegbite (born 22 September 2001) is a Nigerian football player who plays as a forward for Nigeria Professional league club Remo Stars.

Alhameen was known for his attacking incentive, he made his debut for Remo Stars in their 1–0 home win against Wikki Tourists.

Club career 
Alhameen Adegite started playing for Karamone academy before joining Remo Stars in the mid-season transfer break alongside Sikiru Alimi. He played full ninety minutes on his home debut at matchday 26 of the 2021/2022 NPFL Season

He scored his first NPFL goal in the 3–2 loss against Kastina United

References 

2001 births
Living people
Remo Stars F.C. players
Nigerian footballers